The following is a list of characters from Fear the Walking Dead, a television series that is a companion series and prequel to The Walking Dead, which is based on the comic book series of the same name.

Cast

Main cast

Main cast

Recurring cast

Main characters

Madison Clark

Madison Clark, portrayed by Kim Dickens, is a former high school guidance counselor and is the mother to Nick and Alicia and ex-fiancé  of Travis. Madison is described as intelligent and willful to the point she sometimes becomes forceful. She is quick to adapt to the new world. Highly domineering, Madison likes being in control of situations, and is prone to feeling tense during disagreements with others or in situations where she is largely powerless. Even though she usually maintains a stubborn demeanor, Madison often becomes afraid and uncertain when the people she cares about (especially her family) are in danger. She has shown to have a ruthlessly dark and uncaring side.

Travis Manawa

Travis Manawa, portrayed by Cliff Curtis, is a former English teacher who divorced from his wife Elizabeth Ortiz and had to deal with the resentment of his troubled son Chris. Travis later became engaged to guidance counselor Madison Clark and integrated himself into her family including her two children, Nick and Alicia. Travis is a good-natured man and loving father, a protective, pragmatic and resolute individual who holds a firm personal conviction and belief that everything can be fixed, one way or another. He has been described as "the one character who desperately tries to cling to his humanity, the one person who believes that there is always a way to repair something that is broken and that a corner will always be turned" and "a good man trying to do right by everyone in his life". He holds a strong belief that civilization will eventually be rebuilt.

Nick Clark

Nick Clark, portrayed by Frank Dillane, is the son of Madison Clark and Steven Clark, who died a few years before the apocalypse, and the brother of Alicia Clark. Nick has had a troubled past and has always chosen the wrong road. He is very down to earth but flawed individual with severe addictions to drugs, specifically heroin. Despite his flaws, Nick is a very intelligent young man, and is shown to care for his immediate family and eventually the family of his mother's boyfriend Travis after some reluctance. He is quite intelligent and quick thinking, such as being the first member of the group to realize that the infected aren't infected, but rather dead, going as far as to prevent Alicia from visiting Matt, as he knew he would already be dead and attack her. However he can be selfish at times, such as taking Griselda Salazar's oxycontin which she was using due to her injury.

Alicia Clark

Alicia Clark, portrayed by Alycia Debnam-Carey, is the daughter of Madison and Steven Clark, who died a few years before the apocalypse. She is the younger sister of Nick Clark. She was a formerly high-ranking member and resident of the Broke Jaw Ranch community as she becomes a de facto co-leader, and briefly had a relationship with Jake Otto.

Liza Ortiz

Elizabeth "Liza" Ortiz, portrayed by Elizabeth Rodriguez, is a main character in the first two seasons of Fear the Walking Dead. Liza is the ex-wife of Travis Manawa and the mother of Chris Manawa. Liza is a described as a "Latino-American and one of many LA residents dealing with the start of the outbreak". Following her and Travis's divorce, Chris blames his father for their separation.

Liza is killed off in the first-season finale when her husband Travis shoots her out of mercy after being bitten by a walker. After her death, Chris is shown to be even more angered and traumatized and blames his father Travis.

Character development
Liza is first seen when she meets up with her ex-husband Travis and their son Chris. A riot erupts after police shoot down another zombie, but the three Manawas find refuge with the Salazars. While a riot rages outside, a mob sets fire to the store adjoining the barbershop, forcing the Salazars and Manawas to flee. The group reaches Travis' truck and escapes, but not before Griselda is injured by a collapsing scaffold. Unable to reach a hospital, the group drives to Madison's house. All three families decide to stay the night and evacuate in the morning. Liza tends to Griselda's injured foot but notes that Griselda will die if not treated by a doctor. The next morning, as the Clarks and Manawas start driving away, the National Guard arrives and quarantines the block. While Travis says, "It's going to get better," Daniel laments that it's, "too late," as he watches a guardsman mark the neighboring house. Days after the National Guard quarantines the neighborhood into a Safe Zone, residents try to live normally. Tensions build under the military rule. Dr. Exner determines that Liza is not technically a nurse. The US Navy takes Griselda and Nick to a hospital. Liza agrees to go to assist the medical team, despite not wanting to leave her son. Liza helps Dr. Exner with patients at the hospital. Chris is devastated that Liza left voluntarily to help at the hospital, but Travis promises to bring her back. Travis convinces Moyers' squad to take him to the hospital to check on his friends. Griselda dies of septic shock at the hospital; Liza shoots her brain to prevent reanimation. The group drives to the National Guard's headquarters to rescue Liza, Griselda, and Nick. Adams agrees to be their guide when let go by Travis. The group infiltrates the base after Daniel distracts the guards by leading a horde of walkers from the arena. Travis, Madison, Daniel, and Ofelia go inside, while Alicia and Chris stay behind. Meanwhile, the walkers breach the perimeter defenses and swarm the base. Travis' group reach the holding cells and set the detainees free before reuniting with Nick, Liza, and Strand. They try to escape through the medical ward, where they discover Dr. Exner has euthanized all of the patients. Dr. Exner tells them of an escape route before presumably committing suicide. Strand leads the group to his oceanside mansion. On the beach, Liza reveals to Madison that she had been bitten during the escape. Liza pleads with Madison and Travis to euthanize her before she turns. Travis promises to protect Chris before shooting Liza.

The group holds a funeral for Liza and buries her at sea. However, Chris reacts violently and blames Travis for her death.

Ofelia Salazar

Ofelia Salazar, portrayed by Mercedes Mason, is the daughter of Daniel and Griselda Salazar. After the death of her mother and apparent loss of her father, Ofelia becomes much more distant. Ofelia is described as being born in El Salvador and immigrating to Los Angeles with her parents when she was a baby. She is strong, independent, beautiful; professional but fierce, protective of her parents whom she feels are backwards – no one messes with her mother and father.

Chris Manawa

Chris Manawa, portrayed by Lorenzo James Henrie, is the teenage son of Travis Manawa and Liza Ortiz. Christopher was shown to be a normal, highly intelligent teenager before the apocalypse occurred, though he did appear to be extremely angered at his father for leaving and seemed to hold this against him for the rest of his life. Chris slowly adapted to the apocalypse in the beginning and retained his kind side, though after the death of his mother, he is shown to be even more angered and traumatized. But later on during the apocalypse, Chris takes a dramatic turn for the worst and is shown to be angered at his father, distant from everyone and has turned into a noticeably colder individual. He is shown to willing allow members of his own group to die as shown when he almost allows Madison to be killed by walkers and threatens to kill Alicia if she tells of what happened.

Daniel Salazar

Daniel Salazar, portrayed by Rubén Blades, is the husband of Griselda and the father of Ofelia. He is Lola Guerrero's former chief security officer at the Gonzalez Dam. Daniel is a highly intelligent, caring, cautious and formidable man who is a strong, determined survivor. Daniel's past as a secret agent of the Salvadoran Junta and CIA has revealed him to be a highly trained killer, having directly killed 100 people himself (with many more killed indirectly). His training and survival skills have shaped him into a formidable combatant. He is highly adept with firearms and hands to hand combat. Daniel is also shown to be a skilled torturer with extensive knowledge of interrogation techniques and is willing, albeit reluctantly, to use this skill when he feel it is necessary to survive, as seen when he brutally tortured Andrew Adams. Daniel however does not appear to be pleased with the past atrocities he has committed or was forced to commit, and regrets being the monster that he was forced to become. Despite his murderous past, Daniel has demonstrated that he cares about his family more than anything else and is a loving husband and father who vowed to give his daughter the best life possible. Daniel was shown to be devastated by the loss of his beloved wife, the anchor that kept him stable. He subsequently came unhinged for a time and nearly killed himself. Daniel is extremely cautious around those he does not trust, such as Victor Strand and appears to be highly skilled at identifying a potential threat. While under the leadership of Dante Esquivel, Daniel briefly re-embraces his cruel nature but ultimately turns on Dante and his men, saving his allies from certain death, demonstrating that he will never harm the innocent again and that he is ready to kill a threat without any hesitation.

In December 2018, it was reported that Rubén Blades would return in season 5 as Daniel Salazar.

Victor Strand

Victor Strand, portrayed by Colman Domingo, is a mysterious character who has acquired great personal wealth as immediately indicated by his suit and jewelry, then later by his gated coast-side estate, Aston Martin and luxury yacht, the Abigail. He appears to already have some knowledge of the outbreak and how it manifests itself in humans. It is unknown how long he was imprisoned at the temporary hospital set up in Raynard Community College before Nick arrived. He is calm and does not panic when confronting the walkers, even when he was trapped at the end of a locked corridor as a herd approached. He appears to have adapted quickly to the new world, telling Nicholas Clark that the only way to survive a mad world is to embrace the madness. Victor has a good sense of judgement, believing that Nick has the skills to survive, identifying his heroin addiction as a precursor to the behavior necessary for survival. Strand later joined Madison and her group.

Alex

Alex, portrayed by Michelle Ang, is a pragmatic and quiet survivor of Asian descent introduced in the Fear the Walking Dead: Flight 462 web series. Alex appears to have more knowledge about the infection than others. When a dangerous situation occurs she is quick to take rational steps to stop it, even if others dislike or are confused about her actions. After the plane crashed, she went to great lengths to protect a severely injured Jake from dying, decisively killing two passengers who tried to harm him.

Character development
Alex is first seen swimming to her wounded companion, Jake, after Flight 462 crashed into the middle of ocean. She brings Jake to a raft with other survivors. Tom, one of the survivors, smacks an infected passenger with an oar and pushes him overboard. Tom warns Alex that Jake is dying and urges her to kill him before he turns. That night, Alex stabs Tom when he tries to kill Jake in his sleep. Michael, the remaining survivor, encourages Alex to put Jake out of his misery. A week later, Alex is then seen running over a dune away from a herd of walkers, yelling at Daniel that the herd are coming. The two begin to make their way back to the group. When the survivors are surrounded, Alex helps in fighting them off until they are pushed to the edge of a cliff. When Nick rescues the group while camouflaged in walker gore, they make for the Zodiac boat on the shore. When they finally made it onto the water, Alex tells them they need to make a stop, to retrieve Jake and the raft. When they make it to Abigail, Strand refuses to let them on board, so the others allow the raft to be towed behind Abigail, also supplied with some fresh water and towels. While sailing, Alex comforts a severely injured Jake by telling him it can not get worse than it already is. As the sun is setting, Strand suddenly dashes to the stern and swiftly hacks the rope attaching the raft, abandoning Alex and Jake in the middle of the ocean. Alex is seen again when Travis is imprisoned on Connor's ship. She explains to Travis that Connor rescued her after Jake died. She blames Travis for being cut away from The Abigail, which felt like a death warrant to her. Her fate is left unknown.

Luciana Galvez

Luciana Galvez, portrayed by Danay García is Nick's girlfriend and a former scout for La Colonia, a survivor community in Tijuana, Baja California and was briefly a resident of the Broke Jaw Ranch community. She later joins the Dell Diamond baseball stadium community and is a member of Morgan Jones' group.

Character development

Nick wanders off on his own toward Tijuana, but on the way he is attacked by another survivor and forced to leave behind his supplies. Nick eventually passes out due to malnourishment. A group of survivors observe Nick, but their leader, Luciana, opts not to help him. During this ordeal, Nick has several flashbacks to his time with his girlfriend in rehab for their drug addictions. It is there where he expresses his frustration at his father's lack of attention to him. He is later visited by Madison, who tells him that his father died in a car crash. During the last flashback, at the church during the opening scenes of the first episode of the series, Nick wakes to find his girlfriend, zombified, eating another drug addict. Nick then regains consciousness and manages to limp his way to Tijuana. He encounters Luciana's group, who take him to their community to be treated. Nick begins to observe Luciana's community, and is shocked to see Luciana's people banish an infected man, where he voluntarily allows himself to be eaten by walkers. Luciana explains that those who are infected or terminally ill sacrifice themselves to help build the "Wall", a barrier of walkers meant to protect the community from outside threats. Nick then accompanies Luciana on a supply run to a nearby supermarket, which is controlled by an armed gang. Nick is caught trying to shoplift, but he manages to bargain for his life and more supplies by threatening to cut off the supply of medicine the community has been trading with the gang. Luciana scolds Nick for his recklessness, as now the gang will be interested in finding out where her community is. Nick is then brought before the community's leader, Alejandro, who explains to Nick that he keeps the community together by preaching that the undead plague is merely a test from God, and those that survive will inherit the Earth. To preserve their dwindling medicine supplies, Nick proposes to Alejandro that they trick the bandits they promised to trade medicine to by secretly diluting it with powdered milk. Alejandro is impressed with Nick's ingenuity and accepts him fully into his community by giving him his own house. He also confirms to Nick that he had been bitten by a walker and somehow did not turn. However, one of the community's scouts returns and reports that Luciana's brother Pablo has been killed. Luciana is shocked at the news and is comforted by Nick. Later that night, Luciana visits Nick, and they both begin to kiss. In the community, Alejandro refuses to back down and orders the community members to prepare to defend their homes against the bandits. Not wanting to get caught in the fighting, Nick quietly leaves the community, and notices a helicopter landing at a town on the American side of the border. He returns to the community to convince Alejandro to evacuate the community. The next day, when Marco and his bandits arrive, they find the community seemingly abandoned. However, unknown to them, a terminally ill Alejandro breaks open the community's improvised gate, allowing the infected to enter and forcing Marco and his men to flee. Nick and Luciana lead their group out of the colony and towards the border. When Madison's group arrive at the community and find that Marco and his men have been killed by the infected. Alicia finds a dying Alejandro, and his last words instruct them to look for Nick at the border. Meanwhile, as Nick and Luciana lead their group across the border, they catch sight of the helicopter again before they are suddenly attacked by another armed group. The survivors flee, but Nick and Luciana are captured.

In season 3, Nick and an injured Luciana are taken captive by Troy Otto and his men. The two inadvertently cause the base to become overrun by the undead, but they are reunited with Nick's family and friends. With Luciana having been left unconscious from her worsening condition, Nick successfully forces the Otto family to treat her and she eventually recovers from her injuries. However, Luciana decides to leave Nick and the Broke Jaw Ranch in order to return to Mexico and seek out any survivors of her people.

By the start of season 4 two years later, Luciana has been reunited with Nick and has resumed her romantic relationship with him. However, their community at the Dell Diamond Baseball Stadium is destroyed by a massive attack by the Vultures, apparently killing everyone aside from Luciana, Nick, Strand and Alicia. The group seek revenge, leading them to briefly come into conflict with Morgan Jones and his new friends John Dorie and Al. While seeking revenge upon Ennis alone, Nick is killed in retaliation by a young girl named Charlie, devastating Luciana. After successfully getting revenge upon the Vultures and being stopped from killing Charlie, Luciana falls into a depression and is left somewhat aimless. Following a massive hurricane, Luciana meets the mysterious Polar Bear who, before dying, inspires her to continue his work of helping other people.

In season 5, Luciana joins the rest of Morgan's group in their mission to aid other survivors. However, she is badly injured in a plane crash in the season premiere and she spends an extended period of time recovering from her shoulder wound. After discovering Polar Bear's Tank Town oil fields, Luciana remains there producing oil until Logan and his gang invade. When Virginia and her Pioneers take over, Luciana agrees to show them how to make the gas in exchange for the others being allowed to leave with a tanker full of gas. She is later brought to Humbug's Gulch where she tries to reassure her friends as they are captured by Virginia's group.

In season 6, Luciana continues to run Tank Town for Virginia until it is destroyed by a doomsday cult. After Virginia's defeat, Luciana moves to Morgan's new community where she accompanies Alicia, Al and Wes on their reconnaissance mission into the cult's base, the Holding. After the cult successfully launches ten nuclear warheads, Luciana joins Daniel, Wes, Sarah, Jacob, Charlie and Rollie in seeking shelter from the coming destruction. Realizing that Rollie is a traitor who has sold them out, Daniel asks Luciana for her gun before executing the man with it. As Daniel has been proven to have been right, Luciana backs him up about the coordinates that he had heard over the radio which turn out to have come from Al who has sent her CRM pilot friend Isabelle to rescue the group. As they fly away, Luciana reassures Daniel that he just needs a little help and that as long as they stick together, they will be fine.

In season 7, Luciana works with Daniel on his mental issues, forming a close bond with him. However, Daniel becomes convinced that his daughter Ofelia is still alive and wanders off, causing Daniel, Luciana and Wes to get captured by the Stalkers, leading to a lot of frustration between the group. After Daniel brutally kills Arno, the leader of the Stalkers, Luciana is able to convince the rest to join their fight against Strand and his forces at the Tower. With Luciana having witnessed him at his worst and still only expressed nothing but acceptance and understanding, an emotional Daniel declares that they might not be blood, but he and Luciana are family from now on. However, after Daniel reveals that only the thought that Ofelia is still alive keeps him going, Luciana lies to him that Ofelia is in Strand's Tower as she believes that they need Daniel's help to win against Strand and that it is the only way to get it. Disgusted by Luciana's actions, Wes abandons the group for Strand and Luciana sticks to her lie even though Daniel warns her that it could break him for good if he discovers that Ofelia really isn't in the Tower. When Daniel finally gets into the Tower, he learns the truth from Strand who attempts to continue Luciana's lie using Charlie. However, Strand, Alicia and Charlie are finally able to snap Daniel out of it and back to normal. Subsequently, Daniel seems to be more confused by Luciana's actions than hurt or angry about them. Luciana apologizes to her friend for what she did, but their conversation is interrupted when they are forced to take cover from gunfire.

Jeremiah Otto

Jeremiah Otto, portrayed by Dayton Callie, is the father of Jake and Troy and the former leader and one of the four founding fathers of the Broke Jaw Ranch community. Described by showrunner Dave Erickson as having a "certain moral compass", Jeremiah is "definitely rough", with a "darker and uglier side to him as well, and it's frankly racist". Erickson has noted that Jeremiah will become "violent when he has to be".

Jeremiah is killed off in the third-season episode "Children of Wrath", after Nick shoots him due to his lack of co-operation with Qaletaqa Walker.

Character development
Jeremiah is first seen walking along the Mexican-American border with his assault rifle, where he sees Ofelia Salazar walking in the desert. He begins shooting at her, firing at her until she hides behind a tree. Soon after, he approaches her and aims his gun at her, asking Ofelia to hand over her knife, before taking Ofelia away.

Travis, Madison and Alicia are captured by an armed group and taken to a military compound, where Travis is separated from them and is taken to a basement while Madison and Alicia are taken to an office. At the basement, Travis finds himself with Nick, an injured Luciana and other captives. The captives are shot to see how long it takes for them to turn. Travis, Luciana, and Nick attempt to escape, Travis and Luciana descending into a sewer but Travis is re-captured and made to fight the dead in a pit. Meanwhile, Madison and Alicia attack Troy, impaling one of his eyes with a spoon and taking him hostage. Madison demands her family released. Nick finds a horde of walkers at the end of the sewer and makes his way back. The family is reunited but the compound is overrun with walkers, forcing everyone to leave. Travis, Luciana and Alicia escape aboard a helicopter while Madison and Nick leave in a truck with Troy.

Troy Otto

Troy Otto is a fictional character in the television series Fear the Walking Dead portrayed by Daniel Sharman, he is the youngest son of Jeremiah Otto and Jake's half-brother. Troy was a formerly high-ranking member of the Broke Jaw Ranch community. He is described as having a "wild temperament" and being "charismatic with a cruel streak".

Described as having "embraced the violence of the apocalypse", with his "isolationist viewpoint" of being "intensely suspicious of outsiders" having allowed him to be "better-suited for leading in this new post-apocalyptic world", after having a hateful mother and drunk negligent father. Troy is the last surviving member of his family, as well as the last survivor of Broke Jaw Ranch.

Character biography
Travis, Madison and Alicia are captured by an armed group and taken to a military compound, where Travis is separated from them and is taken to a basement while Madison and Alicia are taken to an office. At the basement, Travis finds himself with Nick, an injured Luciana and other captives. The captives are shot to see how long it takes for them to turn. Travis, Luciana, and Nick attempt to escape, Travis and Luciana descending into a sewer but Travis is re-captured and made to fight the dead in a pit. Troy enters a locked office where Madison and Alicia are being held. He offers them tea and seems hospitable, until he starts interrogating them. Madison explains to Troy that she's looking for her son, Nick. Madison then demands to know where they've taken Travis. Troy avoids answering, but promises to let them go once he's finished "processing" them. He takes an interest in Madison. She impales one of his eyes with a spoon and takes him hostage, demanding her family's release. Nick finds a horde of walkers at the end of the sewer and makes his way back. The family is reunited and Jake chastises Troy for killing innocent people. The Clark's decline Jake's invitation to Broke Jaw Ranch, but the compound is overrun with walkers, forcing everyone to leave. Travis, Luciana and Alicia escape aboard a helicopter with Jake and Charlene while Madison and Nick leave in a truck with Troy.

They reach Broke Jaw Ranch and learn the helicopter did not arrive. Jake, Alicia and Luciana later return to the ranch, the helicopter having been shot down, resulting in Travis's death and leading to Charlene's. Troy, Jake and Jeremiah vow to the ranch they will get justice. Troy expresses contempt for Nick to Madison. Jake warns Troy to leave the Clark family alone. Troy takes Nick on a boar hunt, planning to attack him; instead they begin to become friends. The team investigating the helicopter shooting are overdue; Troy leads a second team with Madison accompanying them. They are ambushed by Native Americans lead by Qaletaqa Walker, on whose ancestral land Broke Jaw Ranch is built. They return to the ranch without their weapons or shoes. During the trek back, Troy contemplates killing Madison after she gives unwanted leadership advice. With the threat of the Native Americans invading the ranch, the Trimbol family leave despite Troy's efforts to get them to stay. Troy follows the family and murders them. Troy helps to train the militia. At Madison's insistence, Troy leads a team to rescue Alicia from Black Hat Reservation, breaking a truce and killing several of Walker's men. When Walker's group move onto the ranch, Troy is incensed. He refuses to hand over his weapons leading to a gunfight before Nick convinces him to stand down. Madison convinces Walker not to execute Troy and he is instead exiled.

After being exiled from the ranch, Troy lives off of the land while continuing to write in his journal. He revisits the scene of the helicopter crash, finds a grenade launcher and buries the rancher Walker had disfigured. Troy visits Nick in the night and warns him that the ranch will be destroyed. Nick and Jake set out to find Troy and discover him using the grenade launcher to guide a herd of walking dead toward the ranch. Troy explains that the herd will kill people or force them into the desert, as he was, and only the fittest will survive. Jake holds Troy at gunpoint but hesitates on learning that Nick killed their father and Alicia kept it secret. Jake is bitten and dies following an amputation, and Troy mourns his brother, saying he brought the herd to regain their legacy. A wall of trailers and RVs hope to turn the herd but this fails and the ranchers and natives evacuate to the bunker-like pantry. Troy subsequently joins Nick in an attempt to rescue the survivors from the pantry, but it fails, leaving them trapped until Madison, Strand and Walker arrive to rescue them and Alicia, Ofelia and Crazy Dog, the only survivors of the group that had gone into the pantry.

Following the destruction of the ranch, Troy joins Madison's group with Nick covering up his friend's role in the ranch's destruction. Troy travels with Nick in particular, forming a deep bond with him. However, Troy's actions come to light during the fight for the dam with Troy proving to be unrepentant. Enraged, Madison bashes Troy's head in with a hammer in revenge, killing him. His body is subsequently washed out with the flood when the dam is destroyed.

Jake Otto

Jeremiah Otto, Jr., better known as Jake, portrayed by Sam Underwood, is Jeremiah's moralistic older son and Troy's half-brother. After being bitten by a walker, he dies, turns and has to be put down.

Lola Guerrero

Lola Guerrero, portrayed by Lisandra Tena, is the former chief water utility officer and later the leader of the Gonzalez Dam community. She is shot dead in the third season finale at the Gonzalez Dam.

Morgan Jones

Morgan Jones, portrayed by Lennie James, is a main character on The Walking Dead. Shortly after defeating the Saviors, Morgan leaves the Junkyard and begins working his way west, ending up in Texas where he meets John Dorie. After running into a hostile group of survivors, the two men are rescued by a journalist named Althea and are then captured by Victor Strand, Luciana Galvez and Nick and Alicia Clark.

John Dorie

John Dorie, portrayed by Garret Dillahunt, is a former police officer who uses 2 Colts Singles as his primary weapon and is also a man of fascinating contradictions and one of the first survivors Morgan encountered in Season 4. He is a gentle soul, an innocent person in many ways, but it is no stranger to violence. He can be soft-spoken and disarmingly funny at the same time, but when the situation gets worse he shows his tough side.

In season 6's "The Door," John is shot in the chest and murdered by Dakota with one of his own guns. His body washes up in front of his cabin as a walker and his wife June puts him down. In "Things Left to Do," June buries John's body in front of his cabin and later kills Virginia with the same gun that Dakota killed John with, blaming Virginia for her husband's murder.

Althea Szewczyk-Przygocki

Althea Szewczyk-Przygocki, portrayed by Maggie Grace, is a curious and tactical journalist who encounters Morgan Jones and John Dorie on the road through Virginia. In season 5, it is revealed that she is also a pilot and is LGBT. In the seventh season, she is downgraded to a recurring character and departs with her lover Isabelle to find a new life, albeit one on the run from the CRM.

June Dorie

June Dorie, also known as Naomi and Laura, portrayed by Jenna Elfman. She fell in love with John Dorie after washing up at the bank behind his cabin, and he nursed her back to health. She did not tell him her name, leading him to refer to her as Laura. She left him one day out of fear of emotional attachment, always worrying he would realize she was not the Laura he fell in love with. Later, June becomes a resident of the Dell Diamond baseball stadium community until its fall and is later a member of the Vultures until the death of their leader Melvin. Then, June reunites  with John and decides to re-engage in a relationship. She is currently a very important member and nurse of Morgan's group. She and John eventually marry, but John is killed by Dakota.

Charlie
Charlie, portrayed by Alexa Nisenson.

Sometime during the outbreak, Charlie's parents were killed, and they turned in front of her, scarring her deeply. Later, Charlie was found by Ennis and was recruited to join the Vultures. She is accountable for Nick Clark's death but understood her mistake and is forgiven and accepted by the group. Charlie often uses her skills to get into hard-to-reach places, forming a bond with Alicia Clark and Daniel Salazar in particular.

In season 7, Charlie joins Strand's Tower as part of an infiltration mission and falls in love with one of Strand's young Rangers Ali. However, while on a mission together, Charlie is exposed to a lethal dose of radiation, believed to be alpha particles from the radioactive walkers, and she develops terminal radiation sickness. Furthermore, Ali is murdered soon afterwards by Howard for his betrayal. Charlie's condition is shown to be rapidly deteriorating, leaving her bedridden soon after she first gets sick and with June and Grace predicting that she only has a few weeks left to live at most. When Daniel enters the Tower, it is his bond with the dying Charlie that helps to finally snap him out of his delusions. Daniel promises to take care of Charlie for the little time that she has left, being there for her in the way that he couldn't be for his own daughter.

Grace Mukherjee

Grace Mukherjee, portrayed by Karen David, is a mysterious and terminally ill woman who used to work at a nuclear power plant that melted down near the site where the plane of Morgan's group crashed. She eventually becomes the love interest of Morgan Jones.

Dwight

Dwight, portrayed by Austin Amelio is a main character in The Walking Dead. In season 5, he made his first appearance in the spin-off Fear the Walking Dead, becoming the second character to crossover, the first being Morgan in the fourth season, Dwight was a ruthless and reluctant lieutenant member of "The Saviors" a group of people who subjugated communities (including Alexandria, Hilltop and The Kingdom), to be given food, supplies in exchange for "protection" Dwight had to do abominable things to save his wife Sherry who was held captive by Negan (the leader of the Saviors), when the communities revealed Dwight was a key piece for the victory of the rebel communities since he offered to work as a double agent helping especially Alexandria, when the communities manage to defeat the Saviors, Dwight is forced to be exiled due to his atrocities, who repented of his actions decides to leave and go in search of his wife Sherry.

Sarah Rabinowitz 
Sarah Rabinowitz, portrayed by Mo Collins, Along with their adoptive brother Wendell, they are both scammers and good at stealing from people in their path. However, it can be benevolent to those who needed help, offering food and some ways to get to their destination.

Wes 
Wes portrayed by Colby Hollman, is a nihilistic painter and member of Morgan's group. Wes survived the initial stages of the outbreak with his brother, Derek. At some point Derek was killed by walkers. Months later, Wes finds Alicia and Strand, and became a member of Morgan's group after saving Janis's life. He was separated for the others by Virginia and her Pioneers, and moved for Tank Town. Following the fall of Virginia, Wes was reunited with Derek who had joined the doomsday cult. Wes was forced to kill his brother during the escape, recognizing that the Derek he had loved was long gone.

In season 7, Wes betrays the group and joins Strand's dictatorship at the Tower, becoming his partner. Now completely disillusioned with other people, Wes only cares about ensuring his own survival, mutinying against Strand and condemning his former friends to death if it means protecting his new home. Wes is finally defeated by Strand, Alicia and Daniel Salazar, but he refuses to stand down and Strand stabs him to death with a sword, much to the shock and anger of Alicia who had believed that she was getting through to Wes.

Dakota 
Dakota portrayed by Zoe Colletti, is Virginia's daughter who grew up believing that she was her younger sister. Dakota hates Virginia and as such, saved Morgan Jones' life after the events of "End of the Line" as she believed that he was the only one capable of killing Virginia. Dakota subsequently murdered a man in "The Key" for which Janis was framed and executed. After her actions come to light in "The Door," Dakota murders John Dorie. Dakota's true parentage comes to light in "Things Left to Do" shortly before Virginia is killed by June who blames Virginia for Dakota's actions as she had known and protected her from any consequences. In "The Beginning," Dakota allows herself to be killed in a nuclear explosion after receiving forgiveness from John Sr. and June and killing Teddy for using her.

In season 7's "Cindy Hawkins," John Sr. finds a reanimated Dakota outside of Teddy's secret bunker when he emerges a couple of months later due to his hallucinations. Calling her another girl that he couldn't save, John Sr. sadly puts Dakota down with her own knife and tells June that he had "put Dakota out of her torment" while he was on the surface. When several walkers come at him during a subsequent trip to the surface, John grabs Dakota's knife from where he had left it impaled in her head and uses it to put down the attacking walkers.

Sherry 
Sherry, portrayed by Christine Evangelista, Dwight's long-missing ex-wife, who fled to Texas from The Saviors, after a long search, Dwight managed to find her whereabouts.

John Dorie Sr. 
John Dorie Sr., portrayed by Keith Carradine, is the father of John Dorie and like his son, a former lawman. He is first mentioned by John when he tells Rabbi Jacob Kessner a story about how in the 1970s when John was just a boy, his father had hunted a serial killer who he had planted evidence upon to send the man away to prison for life. The guilt of doing so caused John Sr. to become an alcoholic and abandon his family, leaving behind for his son John's two signature Colt Single Action Army revolvers. In the present, John Sr. returns after his son's death, revealing that the doomsday cult leader Teddy Maddox is the same serial killer that John Sr. had hunted down in the 1970s, having escaped from prison and resumed his mission of bringing an end to every living person on the planet. After meeting his daughter-in-law June, John Sr. joins forces with Morgan's group to finally bring an end to his old enemy. After the nuclear destruction, John Sr. takes shelter with June in Teddy's secret underground bunker. During his time in the bunker, John discovers that it is the location where Teddy had killed his victims decades before, something that John had never been able to find. John becomes obsessed with finding the body of Teddy's last victim Cindy Hawkins whom he experiences hallucinations of due to going into alcoholic withdrawal. Shortly before the bunker collapses, John finally locates her body hidden in the walls and gains peace on his failure to find her and keep his promise to her mother.

In "Sonny Boy," John reveals to June that he is dying of terminal radiation sickness, having gotten exposed while rescuing Charlie from a radioactive building despite being quick and taking precautions. Determined to ensure his legacy, John embarks upon a suicide mission to deliver baby Mo to Morgan through the Tower's walker moat, wearing a makeshift suit of armor. Although successful, John is bitten on the left shoulder in the process. Already dying and with the herd closing in, John sacrifices himself to the walkers in order to buy Morgan time to escape with the baby.

Supporting characters

Los Angeles
 Art "Artie" Costa, portrayed by Scott Lawrence, is the principal at the high school where Madison and Travis work.
 Tobias, portrayed by Lincoln A. Castellanos, is a wise-beyond-his-years high school senior.
 Matt, portrayed by Maestro Harrell, is Alicia's boyfriend. 
 Griselda Salazar, portrayed by Patricia Reyes Spíndola, is Ofelia's mother, who emigrated from El Salvador with her husband Daniel to escape political unrest.
 Lt. Moyers, portrayed by Jamie McShane, is the leader of the National Guard contingent in charge of protecting Madison's neighborhood.
 Cpl. Andrew Adams, portrayed by Shawn Hatosy, is a well-intentioned military man with a soulful disposition, who is out of his element.
 Dr. Bethany Exner, portrayed by Sandrine Holt, is a confident and skilled doctor.
 Gloria, portrayed by Lexi Johnson, is the former girlfriend of Nick, before this outbreak.

Pacific Coast
 Jack Kipling, portrayed by Daniel Zovatto, is a member of the pirates who develops an attraction to Alicia.
 Connor, portrayed by Mark Kelly, is the captain of a gang of pirates who pursue and capture The Abigail. Connor is also the older brother of Reed.
 Reed, portrayed by Jesse McCartney is Connor's brother and a hostile member of the pirates.
 Vida, portrayed by Veronica Diaz, is a pregnant woman and one of Connor's pirates.

Mexico
 Thomas Abigail, portrayed by Dougray Scott, is Strand's boyfriend and the namesake of the boat Abigail.
 Luis Flores, portrayed by Arturo Del Puerto, is an ally and right-hand man of Victor Strand and Thomas Abigail.
 Celia Flores, portrayed by Marlene Forte, is Luis's mother.
 Alejandro Nuñez, portrayed by Paul Calderón, is a pharmacist and leader of La Colonia, a community in Tijuana, Mexico, he claims to have been bitten, but did not die.
 Marco Rodriguez, portrayed by Alejandro Edda, is the leader of the gang who live near La Colonia.
 Elena Reyes, portrayed by Karen Bethzabe, is the Rosario Beach hotel manager who helps Alicia.
 Hector Reyes, portrayed by Ramses Jimenez, is Elena's nephew who used to manage the hotel with her.
 Oscar Diaz, portrayed by Andres Londono, is the leader of a group of survivors living at a hotel.
 Andres Diaz, portrayed by Raul Casso, is Oscar's brother.
 Ilene Stowe, portrayed by Brenda Strong, is a member of the wedding party and mother-in-law of Oscar.
 Brandon Luke, portrayed by Kelly Blatz, is the leader of a group of young men that befriend Chris.
 Derek, portrayed by Kenny Wormald, is a member of Brandon's group.
 James McCallister, portrayed by Israel Broussard, is a member of Brandon's group.

The Ranch
 Qaletaqa Walker, portrayed by Michael Greyeyes, is a Native American in a war with Jeremiah Otto, who occupies his lands. 
 Blake Sarno, portrayed by Michael William Freeman, is a member of Broke Jaw Ranch's militia. 
 Lee "Crazy Dog", portrayed by Justin Rain, is the right-hand man of Qaletaqa. 
 Cooper, portrayed by Matt Lasky, is a member of Broke Jaw Ranch's militia. 
 Gretchen Trimbol, portrayed by Rae Gray, is a resident of the Broke Jaw Ranch who becomes friends with Alicia. 
 Christine, portrayed by Linda Gehringer, is a resident of the Broke Jaw Ranch who forms a bond with Alicia.

The Dam
 Dante Esquivel, portrayed by Jason Manuel Olazabal, is the leader of Gonzalez Dam. 
 Efrain Morales, portrayed by Jesse Borrego, is a man who saves Daniel after he is injured in a fire. 
 Proctor John, portrayed by Ray McKinnon, is the leader of the gang known as the Proctors.

Baseball Stadium
 Cole, portrayed by Sebastian Sozzi, is a resident of the community within the baseball stadium. Despite his apparent death when the stadium is destroyed, he later returns in the sixth season.
 Vivian, portrayed by Rhoda Griffis, is a resident of the community within the baseball stadium. Despite her apparent death when the stadium is destroyed, she later returns in the sixth season.
 Douglas, portrayed by Kenneth Wayne Bradley, is a resident of the community within the baseball stadium. Despite his apparent death when the stadium is destroyed, he later returns in the sixth season.

The Vultures
 Melvin, portrayed by Kevin Zegers, is the antagonistic leader of the Vultures. 
 Ennis, portrayed by Evan Gamble, is the hostile and arrogant Melvin´s right-hand and younger brother.

Camp Cackleberry 
 Dylan, portrayed by Cooper Dodson, a member of Camp Clackleberry, Annie and Max's younger brother.
 Max, portrayed by Ethan Suess, A teenage survivor and brother to Annie and Dylan.
 Annie, portrayed by Bailey Gavulic, is a leader of group of Camp Clackleberry, Max and Dylan's sister.

The Pioneers
 Virginia, also known as Ginny, portrayed by Colby Minifie, the antagonistic leader of the Pioneers who is older sister of Dakota.
 Janis, portrayed by Holly Curran, a woman who called Alicia and Strand for help and was saved by Wes.
 Hill, portrayed by Craig Nigh, a member of the Pioneers and Virginia's right-hand man.

Miscellaneous survivors
 Diana, portrayed by Edwina Findley, is a pragmatic survivor who becomes friends with Alicia.
 Martha, portrayed by Tonya Pinkins, is a survivor driven insane by the loss of her husband Hank when no one would help them and who sets out to make Morgan Jones strong by killing all of his friends.
 Logan, portrayed by Matt Frewer, the former partner of Clayton (aka "Polar Bear") who tricks Morgan's group and seizes the denim factory for himself.
 Emile LaRoux, portrayed by Demetrius Grosse, is a bounty hunter hired by Virginia to hunt down Morgan.
 Rachel, portrayed by Brigitte Kali, a pregnant woman who is Isaac's wife.
 Isaac, portrayed by Michael Abbott Jr., a desperate survivor who Morgan encountered.
 Jacob Kessner, portrayed by Peter Jacobson, a rabbi who joins Morgan's group.
 Ed, portrayed by Raphael Sbarge, a taxidermist who lives in an old hunting lodge.
 Josiah LaRoux, portrayed by Demetrius Grosse, is Emile's identical twin brother who seeks revenge upon Morgan for Emile's death.

References

External links

 

Lists of American drama television series characters
Lists of horror television characters
Fear the Walking Dead

Comics characters in television